Ross James Brawn  (born 23 November 1954) is a British Formula One managing director, motor sports and technical director.

He is a former motorsport engineer and Formula One team principal, and has worked for a number of Formula One teams. Serving as the technical director of the championship-winning Benetton and Ferrari teams, he earned fame as the "mastermind" behind Michael Schumacher's seven world championship titles. He took a sabbatical in 2007 and returned to F1 for the 2008 season as team principal of Honda. He acquired the Honda team in early 2009 to form the Brawn GP team, which won the Formula One Constructors' and Drivers' Championships in that year. Mercedes bought into the team in November 2009, making Brawn team principal and co-owner with Nick Fry.

In 2011 Brawn and Fry sold the remaining shares to Mercedes Benz, with Brawn remaining as team principal. In November 2013, it was announced that Brawn would step down, and leadership would be handed over to Paddy Lowe and Toto Wolff. Following speculation linking him with other teams, Brawn announced his retirement from Formula One in February 2014.

Teams with Brawn in an essential role have won 8 constructors' championships and 8 drivers' championships in total.

Early life and family 
Brawn was born in Ashton-under-Lyne, Lancashire, England. He became interested in engineering during his early years, often visiting Belle Vue Stadium to watch various forms of motor racing. He moved south aged 11 as his father took a job near Reading, Berkshire and he subsequently attended Reading School in the town.
In 1971 he was taken on as a mechanical craft apprentice by the United Kingdom Atomic Energy Authority at its Atomic Energy Research Establishment in Harwell, Oxfordshire, where he qualified as an instrument mechanic. He went on to start an HNC in Mechanical Engineering, still funded by Harwell. Living in Reading he found an advertisement for Frank Williams Grand Prix, which were based in Reading at that time; he was interviewed by Patrick Head. Williams were looking for a milling machinist which was one of the skills he learnt at Harwell.

Brawn lives in Stoke Row, near Henley-on-Thames. In his spare time he enjoys gardening, fishing and listening to music. In 2006 Brawn received an honorary degree of Doctor of Engineering (DEng) from Brunel University for his services to motorsport.

On 18 November 2011, Brawn received a second honorary doctorate from Heriot-Watt University. He is married to Jean.

Career 
His career in motorsport began in 1976 when he joined March Engineering in the town of Bicester as a milling machine operator. Soon afterwards he joined their Formula 3 racing team as a mechanic. Brawn was hired by Sir Frank Williams in 1978 as a machinist for the newly formed Williams team. He quickly moved up through the ranks, working in the R&D department with Frank Dernie and as an aerodynamicist in the team's wind tunnel.

Brawn joined the Haas Lola team in 1985 and was part of Neil Oatley's design team at FORCE that produced both the Lola THL1 and THL2 cars used by the team. However, with the 4 cylinder Hart engine in the THL1 and the new Ford V6 turbo powering the THL2, results were scarce against teams like McLaren and Williams with their TAG-Porsche and Honda turbo engines. This was despite the cars generally being regarded by most in the F1 paddock as being the best handling cars on the grid, as well as having  World Champion Alan Jones and former factory Ferrari and Renault driver Patrick Tambay as the drivers. When the team left F1 at the end of the  season, Brawn moved to Arrows.

Later in 1989 Brawn moved to the Jaguar Sportscar racing division, and was lead designer on the Jaguar XJR-14 which won the 1991 World Sportscar Championship.

Benetton (1991–1996) 
Later in 1991 Brawn returned to F1 as technical director of the Benetton team, helping it win consecutive World Drivers' Championships in 1994 and 1995 with Michael Schumacher, and to take the World Constructors' Championship in 1995. Brawn was credited by much of the specialist press with being an important part of these championships, particularly in terms of devising race strategy.

Ferrari (1997–2006) 

Brawn followed Schumacher to the Ferrari F1 team in late , at the end of Schumacher's first year with the team. Again he was renowned for his race strategies as the team began to challenge for the championship from 1997, despite the superiority of the Williams cars that year and the McLarens from 1998 onwards. Brawn's contributions to this unprecedented string of titles has led many to label him as a vital member of the Ferrari "dream team" along with Schumacher, team principal Jean Todt and chief designer Rory Byrne. In  Ferrari never quite found form, and had to relinquish the title to Renault, and Schumacher passed the crown to Fernando Alonso. In  Ferrari had a poor start to the season, but clearly had the fastest car by the end of that season.

On 26 October 2006 Ferrari announced that Brawn was to leave the team. It was believed that he would take a one-year sabbatical, to allow other members of the Ferrari technical departments to advance within the team.

Honda (2008) 
Towards the end of 2007 it was reported that Brawn was to join the big-spending Red Bull outfit as part of a package intended to attract double world champion Fernando Alonso, but it was announced on 12 November 2007 that Brawn was to become the new team principal of Honda F1. He started working with the British-based team on 26 November 2007.

With the withdrawal of Honda from Formula One announced in late 2008 Brawn was effectively out of the sport unless a buyer could quickly be found. This was unfortunate for Brawn as he believed that the team had a "race-winning car" for 2009.

Brawn GP (2009) 

On 5 March 2009 a 100% buy-out of Honda F1 was completed, with Brawn taking a controlling 54% stake. They announced entry to the 2009 F1 World Championship under the new name Brawn GP. Minority shareholders were CEO Nick Fry (31%), former Honda finance chief Nigel Kerr (8%), former Honda head of Human Resources John Marsden (3%), former Honda legal counsel Caroline McGrory (3%) and former Honda director Gordon Blair (1%).

Many aspects of Honda F1 were retained under the new ownership, including the experienced driver line-up of Rubens Barrichello and Jenson Button. Brawn GP chose to source their engines for the 2009 season from Mercedes-Benz. In the first Grand Prix of 2009 in Australia, Button qualified in pole position with Barrichello in 2nd place, they went on to finish in those positions. Of the 19 Grand Prix races of the 2009 season, Button won 6 and Barrichello won 2, while the team finished in both 1st and 2nd places in 4 races and in podium positions in 11 races.

The Brawn team was given a financial boost on the eve of the Australian GP when Virgin boss Sir Richard Branson announced he was going to become a team sponsor. The team then got a second sponsor on board, the Swiss brokers MIG Investments. Brawn GP won the 2009 Formula One World Constructors' Championship and one of its drivers, Jenson Button, won the World Drivers' Championship at the Brazilian Grand Prix.

Brawn was appointed Officer of the Order of the British Empire (OBE) in the 2010 New Year Honours for services to motorsport.

Mercedes (2010–2013) 
Brawn GP was bought out by Mercedes-Benz in November 2009. Brawn, as majority shareholder, stood to do very well financially from the deal and remained as team principal. He and Nick Fry kept a 24.9% share in the new team, which was then sold to Mercedes in early 2011. In December 2009 seven-time world champion Michael Schumacher confirmed that the main reason he decided to come out of retirement and drive for Mercedes GP was because of Brawn. It was at Benetton and at Ferrari where Brawn masterminded Schumacher's seven world titles.

The start of the 2010 season was rather slow, and in the first three races, Schumacher managed only 6th in Bahrain, 10th in Australia, and retired in Malaysia because of a lost wheel nut, whilst Schumacher's teammate and fellow-countryman Nico Rosberg had a bit more success with the car, finishing 5th in Bahrain and in Australia and scoring the first podium for Mercedes Grand Prix with a 3rd place in Malaysia.

The team won their first race on 15 April 2012, when Nico Rosberg won the Chinese Grand Prix. The team continued its good run from China with Schumacher qualifying fastest at Monaco, and Rosberg finishing on the podium. However, towards the end of the season, the team had some lacklustre results. In the 2012 Japanese Grand Prix Schumacher announced his retirement from Formula 1, and Mercedes announced that the 2008 world champion and McLaren driver, Lewis Hamilton, was to join their line-up, pairing with Rosberg for the 2013 F1 season.

2013 started much as 2012 had ended for Mercedes, as the pre-season indicated that the car was unreliable, with Rosberg suffering from damage to his exhaust on the first day of testing in Jerez, and Hamilton suffering a brake failure on the second day. However, as testing continued Mercedes showed signs of pace, particularly in the final Barcelona test. At the first race in Melbourne both Rosberg and Hamilton qualified well inside the top 10, with Hamilton finishing 5th place whilst Rosberg suffered more problems with his car, eventually retiring. In the second race of the season, Mercedes finished 3rd (Hamilton) and 4th (Rosberg), amid a controversial Malaysian Grand Prix. Brawn spoke to both drivers over team radio asking them to hold position for fear of high degrading Pirelli tyres and a lack of fuel on board both cars. The third race at China established Mercedes' pace as title contenders when Hamilton took Mercedes' second pole position in two years at China whilst Rosberg qualified 4th. Hamilton went on to finish in 3rd place but Rosberg again had to retire with an anti-rollbar failure.

Rosberg took pole at the next three Grands Prix and brought Mercedes their first win of the season in Monaco, however the victory was overshadowed by controversy after Mercedes used a current (2013) car when undertaking a tyre test at the invitation of Pirelli shortly before the Grand Prix. The team were reprimanded by the FIA and banned from a subsequent young drivers' test but did not lose any championship points. The car continued to perform much better in qualifying than in the race for the rest of the season. Hamilton took four more pole positions and Mercedes won two more races, in Britain (Rosberg) and Hungary (Hamilton). Following multiple tyre failures at the British Grand Prix, Pirelli reverted to the 2012 components after the summer break, which saw Sebastian Vettel and Red Bull win all the remaining races and the championships. Mercedes finished second in the constructors' championship, while Hamilton and Rosberg finished 4th and 5th in the drivers' standings.

On 29 October, the BBC reported that Brawn would leave Mercedes at the end of the 2013 season, following disagreement about his role in the team and on 28 November it was reported that he would leave the team at the end of the year.

2014 to 2016

On 1 February 2014, Brawn announced his retirement from Formula One, ending speculation of a possible position at the Woking-based McLaren team.

The FIA announced in October 2014 that Brawn would be a member of a 10-strong panel to investigate Jules Bianchi's crash at the 2014 Japanese Grand Prix and that the panel would report to the World Motor Sport Council in December.

In an interview with The Daily Telegraph in October 2016 Brawn indicated that he was ready to return to Formula 1, though in a strategic rather than a team role. His book on strategy in Formula 1, Total Competition, was released a week later.

Formula One Management (2017–2022) 

On 23 January 2017 it was announced that Ross Brawn was appointed to the newly created role of managing director, Motor Sports and technical director for the Formula One Group. Following the 2022 season, rumors emerged he may return to Ferrari as team principal, however on 28 November 2022 he confirmed he was retiring from F1.

Personal life

Charity work
In 2010 Brawn, a member of the RNLI, set up the Brawn Lifeboat Challenge to fund a new lifeboat for the River Thames in London. The venture raised £360,000 in 8 months and the new E-class lifeboat Brawn Challenge was launched in September 2012.  In 2014 he became a patron of Hope for Tomorrow, a charity which provides NHS trusts with mobile cancer care units so that they can provide cancer treatment in local communities.

Speeding offence 
He was speeding in his Mercedes-Benz E320 Saloon on the 70 mph (112 km/h) limited A30 at Sourton near Okehampton, Devon on 30 May 2009.
Brawn paid a fine of £700, costs of £75, and had his licence endorsed with six points.

Authorship
Brawn, Ross & Parr, Adam. Total Competition: Lessons in strategy from Formula One. Simon & Schuster (2016).

References

External links 

 BBC radio interview, October 2016
 Ross Brawn: Formula Won

1954 births
Living people
Ferrari people
Honda people
Sportspeople from Manchester
Officers of the Order of the British Empire
British automotive engineers
Auto racing crew chiefs
Formula One designers
Formula One team owners
Formula One team principals
British motorsport designers
Auto racing executives
Arrows Grand Prix International
Mercedes-Benz in Formula One
Benetton Formula
Brawn GP